The 1933 USC Trojans football team represented the University of Southern California (USC) in the 1933 college football season. In their ninth year under head coach Howard Jones, the Trojans compiled a 10–1–1 record (4–1–1 against conference opponents), finished in third place in the Pacific Coast Conference, and outscored their opponents by a combined total of 257 to 30.

Schedule

Season summary

Washington State
 Cotton Warburton 14 rushes, 221 yards

References

USC
USC Trojans football seasons
USC Trojans football